Longchaeus maculosus, common name the sulcate pyram, is a species of sea snail, a marine gastropod mollusk in the family Pyramidellidae, the pyrams and their allies.

Description
The length of the shell varies between 20 mm and 50 mm.

The grayish white shell is elongated, turreted, brilliant and pointed at its summit. It is slightly widened at its base nebulously longitudinally strigate with pale orange-chestnut, frequently breaking up into revolving series of dots. Its color is sometimes inclining to red, spotted with numerous brown spots arranged in transverse series, three in number upon each whorl, and five upon the body whorl. Upon its surface are seen large, brown, dull, and irregular spots.;Sometimes the points which adorn the shell are united, and form undulating, longitudinal lines. The spire is formed of fifteen or sixteen slightly convex, distinct whorls. The shallow suture is linear. The body whorl is short, and not perforated at the base. The small aperture is  subovate, and at its depth are seen indistinct grooves. It is terminated at its base by a small, narrow, and shallow groove.  The columella is somewhat arcuated, and presents three unequal folds towards the base.:The first is most projecting, and runs almost horizontally. The two
others are small, oblique, and parallel. The outer lip is arcuated, thin, sharp and slightly convex.

Young specimens of this species are very slightly striated, and of a reddish color.  Undulating lines and brown spots, distributed here and there, cover the shell. Some specimens are of a still redder color, and the points upon the shell are then more numerous, and of a deeper tint. The length of the shell varies between 18 mm and 50 mm.

Distribution
This marine species occurs in the Red Sea, off New Zealand and in the following locations of the Indian Ocean :
 Aldabra
 Madagascar
 Mascarene Basin
 Tanzania

References

 Dautzenberg, Ph. (1923). Liste préliminaire des mollusques marins de Madagascar et description de deux espèces nouvelles. J. conchyliol. 68: 21-74 
 Kilburn, R.N. & Rippey, E. (1982) Sea Shells of Southern Africa. Macmillan South Africa, Johannesburg, xi + 249 pp. page(s): 129
 Drivas, J. & M. Jay (1988). Coquillages de La Réunion et de l'île Maurice
 Spencer, H.; Marshall. B. (2009). All Mollusca except Opisthobranchia. In: Gordon, D. (Ed.) (2009). New Zealand Inventory of Biodiversity. Volume One: Kingdom Animalia. 584 pp

External links
 Lamarck, (J.-B. M.) de. (1822). Histoire naturelle des animaux sans vertèbres. Tome sixième, 2me partie. Paris: published by the Author, 232 pp.
 Adams, A. (1854). Monographs of the genera Eulima, Niso, Leiostraca, Obeliscus, Pyramidella, and Monoptygma. In G. B. Sowerby II (ed.), Thesaurus conchyliorum, or monographs of genera of shells. Vol. 2 (15): 793-825, pl. 169-172. London, privately published.
 

Pyramidellidae
Gastropods described in 1822